The 2017 Copa do Brasil Finals was the final two-legged tie that decided the 2017 Copa do Brasil, the 29th season of the Copa do Brasil, Brazil's national cup football tournament organised by the Brazilian Football Confederation.

The finals were contested in a two-legged home-and-away format between Flamengo, from Rio de Janeiro, and Cruzeiro, from Minas Gerais. Both teams reached the Copa do Brasil finals for the seventh time, and the second time they faced each other in this stage. The first one was in the 2003 Copa do Brasil finals.

A draw by CBF was held on 24 August 2017 to determine the home-and-away teams for each leg. The first leg was hosted by Flamengo at Maracanã in Rio de Janeiro on 7 September 2017, while the second leg was hosted by Cruzeiro at Mineirão in Belo Horizonte on 27 September 2017.

Tied 1–1 on aggregate, Cruzeiro defeated Flamengo 5–3 on penalties in the finals to win their fifth title. As champions, Cruzeiro earned the right to play in the 2018 Copa Libertadores Group stage and the 2018 Copa do Brasil Round of 16.

Teams

Road to the final

Note: In all scores below, the score of the home team is given first.

Format
In the finals, the teams play a single-elimination tournament with the following rules:
The finals are played on a home-and-away two-legged basis. The home-and-away teams for both legs were determined by a draw held on 24 August 2017 at the Brazilian Football Confederation headquarters in Rio de Janeiro, Brazil.
If tied on aggregate, the away goals rule and extra time would not be used and the penalty shoot-out would be used to determine the winner. (Regulations Article 12.c).

Matches

First leg
In the second leg of the Semi-finals against Botafogo, Paolo Guerrero (Flamengo) picked up a yellow card which meant he was suspended for the first leg of the Finals.

In the first leg, Lucas Paquetá, who was selected as Guerrero's substitute, opened the scoring in the 75th minute when he smashed in the rebound after Cruzeiro goalkeeper Fábio blocked a Willian Arão's shot. The equalizer came in the 83rd minute when Thiago failed to block a long-range shot from Hudson, allowing De Arrascaeta to take advantage of the rebound.

Second leg
Rafael Sóbis (Cruzeiro), booked in the first leg, and Thiago (Flamengo), scaphoid fracture of the left hand, were ruled out of the second leg. In the second leg, Cruzeiro and Flamengo drew 0–0 at the end of normal time. Tied 1–1 on aggregate, Cruzeiro won on penalties.

See also
2017 Campeonato Brasileiro Série A

References

2017
Finals
Copa do Brasil Finals
CR Flamengo matches
Cruzeiro Esporte Clube matches
Association football penalty shoot-outs